Nicolas Becker may refer to:
 Nicolas Becker (jurist) (born 1946), German jurist and criminal defense lawyer
 Nicolas Becker (sound engineer), French composer and sound engineer
 Nicolas Léonard Beker (1770–1840), or Becker, French general

See also
 Nikolaus Becker (1809–1845), German lawyer and writer